Golden Nugget may refer to:

Brands and enterprises
 Golden Nugget, Inc., a Houston-based casino resort chain
 Golden Nugget Atlantic City, a hotel, casino, and marina in Atlantic City, New Jersey
 Golden Nugget Las Vegas, a luxury hotel and casino in Las Vegas, Nevada
 Golden Nugget Lake Charles
 Golden Nugget Laughlin, a hotel and casino in Laughlin, Nevada
 Golden Nugget Companies (1973–1989), became Mirage Resorts
 Golden Nugget Pancake House, a chain of family restaurants
 Golden Nuggets, a breakfast cereal

Games
 Golden Nugget (video game) for Microsoft Windows and PlayStation
 Golden Nugget 64 for Nintendo 64
 Golden Nugget Casino DS for the Nintendo DS

See also 
 Australian Gold Nugget
 Gold nugget
 List of gold nuggets by size
 Nugget (disambiguation)